Elvira is a 1763 tragedy by the British writer David Mallet.

The original Drury Lane cast included David Garrick as Alonzo, Charles Holland as Don Pedro, John Hayman Packer as Don Roderigo, Susannah Maria Cibber as Elvira and Hannah Pritchard as the Queen.

References

Bibliography
 Nicoll, Allardyce. A History of Early Eighteenth Century Drama: 1700-1750. CUP Archive, 1927.

1763 plays
Tragedy plays
West End plays
Plays by David Mallet